The Canadian federal budget for fiscal year 1998–1999 was a presented by Minister of Finance Paul Martin in the House of Commons of Canada on 24 February 1998.

External links 
 Budget Speech
 Budget Plan
 Budget in Brief
 Budget Overview
 Budget Chart Book
 Article on Canadian Encyclopedia

References

Canadian budgets
1998 in Canadian law
1998 government budgets
1998 in Canadian politics